Saint-Florent-sur-Cher (literally Saint-Florent on Cher) is a commune in the Cher department in central France.

Population

See also
Communes of the Cher department

References

Communes of Cher (department)
Berry, France